This is a list of wind farms in the Republic of Ireland.

Operating

Locations of all the wind farms which have coordinates below, may be seen on a map together by clicking "Map of all coordinates using OpenStreetMap" at the right side of this page.

Proposed or under construction

See also

List of wind farms
Renewable energy
Wind power in the Republic of Ireland
Wind turbine

References

External links

www.sei.ie - Sustainable Energy Ireland, Ireland's national energy agency.
www.iwea.ie - Irish Wind Energy Association
Arklow Bank Wind Park, GE Brochure (PDF)
Sustainable Energy Ireland's report on policies for Renewable Energy programs  (PDF)
Regional map of wind farms
List 2017